Nuestra Belleza México 2016, the 22nd annual Nuestra Belleza México pageant held at Foro 2 of Televisa San Angel in Mexico City on January 31, 2016. Twenty-nine contestants from Mexico competed for the national title, which was won by Kristal Silva from Tamaulipas who also competed in Miss Universe 2016. Silva was crowned by the outgoing Nuestra Belleza México titleholder Wendolly Esparza. She is the third person from Tamaulipas to win the title.

After three consecutive years, the final show of "Nuestra Belleza Mundo México" not was held. Rumors said that this was due to financing issues involving the renewal of the franchise. Other rumors also said that should it be renewed then the Mexican representative would be elected by the designation of a prior participant. On April 26, 2016 the Nuestra Belleza México Organization announced that they will not send a representative to Miss World after 21 years of having done so for the national organization.

The recognition "Corona al Mérito 2016" was for Carolina Morán, Nuestra Belleza Mundo México 2006 and TV hostess.

Results

Nuestra Belleza Mexico

Contestants

Source:

Replacements
 – Samantha Peña was the winner of Nuestra Belleza Guanajuato 2015. The 2nd Runner-up, Daniela Arellano will represent Guanajuato in Nuestra Belleza México 2015. Peña renounced the title for reasons concerning her studies.

Returning states
Last competed in 2011:

Last competed in 2013:

Withdrawals

 – Samantha Peña
 – Susana Rentería

References

NB Nuevo León 2015

External links
Official Website

2016
2016 in Mexico
2016 beauty pageants